The Goblin Chronicles is a three-issue comic book mini-series created and written by Troy Dye and Tom Kelesides, penciled by Collin Fogel, colored by Will Terrell and lettered by David Hedgecock.

The Goblin Chronicles is a high-fantasy adventure story written for an “all ages” audience.
Published by Ape Entertainment, the first issue debuted in comic shops across North America on March 19, 2008.

The Goblin Chronicles is Ape Entertainment's first all-ages comic book published in the fantasy genre. Advance reviews were largely positive.

The Goblin Gadgeteer, a prequel story set in the world of The Goblin Chronicles, appeared in Ape Entertainment's 2007 Free Comic Book Day offering titled Ape's Entertainment's Comic Spectacular. The prequel story focused on one of the four main characters from the miniseries: Gorim the goblin.

Another prequel story, A Tale of Two Shifters, appeared in the Fablewood Anthology, published by Ape Entertainment in February 2008. The story also featured one of the four main characters from the miniseries: Sprig the shape shifter.

References

External links
 The Goblin Chronicles Official Website
 Ape Entertainment's Official Website
 Interview with the creators on Newseed Comics Website
 Interview with the creators on Fanboy Faceoff Podcast

American comics titles